Temnocalyx is a monotypic genus of flowering plants in the family Rubiaceae. It was originally described by Walter Robyns in 1928 and contained five species. Since then most of these species have been made synonym and currently only one species name remains valid, i.e. Temnocalyx nodulosa. The species is endemic to southwestern Tanzania.

References

External links
 World Checklist of Rubiaceae

Monotypic Rubiaceae genera
Enigmatic Rubiaceae taxa
Vanguerieae
Taxonomy articles created by Polbot
Taxobox binomials not recognized by IUCN